Betsy Brown (born 1963) is an American poet.

Life
She is from Oshkosh, Wisconsin. She graduated from the University of Arizona in 1984.

She graduated from the Iowa Writers' Workshop. She lives in Minneapolis, Minnesota.

Her work has been published in American Poetry Review, Seneca Review.

Awards
 2001 National Poetry Series, for Year of Morphine

Works
 "Dignity in the Home", poets.org

Anthologies

References

1963 births
Living people
University of Arizona alumni
Iowa Writers' Workshop alumni
American women poets
Poets from Minnesota
21st-century American poets
21st-century American women writers